The Santa Ysabel Stakes is an American Thoroughbred horse race once run during January but now run in March at Santa Anita Park in Arcadia, California. The race is open to fillies, age three, willing to race one and one-sixteenths miles (8.5 furlongs) on the dirt. The race is a Grade III event with a current purse of $100,000 and is part of the Road to the Kentucky Oaks.

Inaugurated in 1968, the Santa Ysabel Stakes was contested at 7 furlongs in 1970 but has otherwise been run at  miles. It was run in two divisions in 1968, 1970, 1972, and 1979.

Records
Speed record:
 1:41.10 – Midnight Bisou (2018)

Most wins by a jockey:
 4 – Bill Shoemaker (1974, 1978, 1985, 1988)
 4 – Laffit Pincay Jr. (1970, 1973, 1981, 1991)
 4 – Chris McCarron (1983, 1984, 1994, 2002)
 4 – Mike E. Smith (2014, 2016, 2017, 2018)

Most wins by a trainer:
 8 – Bob Baffert (2003, 2009, 2011, 2013, 2014, 2021, 2022, 2023)

Most wins by an owner:
 3 –  	Kaleem Shah  (2011, 2014, 2020)

Winners of the Santa Ysabel Stakes since 1968

A  #  designates that the race was run in two divisions in 1968, 1970, 1972 and 1979.

* † In 1998 Love Lock finished first but was disqualified after testing

References

Horse races in California
Santa Anita Park
Flat horse races for three-year-old fillies
Graded stakes races in the United States
Recurring sporting events established in 1968
Grade 3 stakes races in the United States